France–Tunisia relations are the current and historical relations between France and Tunisia. France conquered Tunisia in 1881 and established the French protectorate of Tunisia, which lasted until Tunisia's independence in 1956. In 1957, France cut off financial aid totaling $33.5 million to Tunisia because of its support for neighboring Algeria's independence movements. At the time, Tunisian President Habib Bourguiba noted "France and Tunisia will never again be exclusive partners". From 1987 until the 2011 Tunisian Revolution, France refused to criticize Tunisian President and ally Zine El Abidine Ben Ali, despite the deaths of numerous non-violent protesters. Ben Ali eventually resigned.

Resident diplomatic missions 
 France has an embassy in Tunis.
 Tunisia has an embassy in Paris and consulates-general in Lyon and Marseille and consulates in Grenoble, Nice, Pantin, Strasbourg and Toulouse.

See also 
 Foreign relations of France 
 Foreign relations of Tunisia
 French conquest of Tunisia
 History of French-era Tunisia

References

Further reading
 Krüger, Laura-Theresa, and Bernhard Stahl. "The French foreign policy U-turn in the Arab Spring–the case of Tunisia". Mediterranean Politics 23.2 (2018): 197-222  online.
 Wood, Pia Christina. "French foreign policy and Tunisia: do human rights matter?". Middle East Policy 8#2 (2002), p. 92+.

External links
 "Libya and Tunisia prompt France foreign policy changes". BBC News, 28 February 2011.

 
Tunisia
Bilateral relations of Tunisia
Relations of colonizer and former colony